The Big Attraction is a 1931 German musical film directed by Max Reichmann and starring Richard Tauber, Margo Lion, and Marianne Winkelstern. It was made by Bavaria Film at the Emelka Studios near Munich. The film's sets were designed by the art director Hans Jacoby.

Cast

References

Bibliography

External links 
 

1931 films
1931 musical films
Films of the Weimar Republic
German musical films
1930s German-language films
Films directed by Max Reichmann
Films scored by Bronisław Kaper
Bavaria Film films
German black-and-white films
1930s German films
Films shot at Bavaria Studios